Education in Niue is free and compulsory for 8 years. Niue has one primary school, and in 1995, the gross and net primary enrollment rates were both 100 percent. The government has collaborated with UNESCO to develop an Education for All plan to improve learning achievements and provide better educational opportunities for children with special needs.

References

 

fr:Niue#Éducation